Mladen Sarajlin (born 17 April 1995) is a Serbian football forward.

Honours
Napredak Kruševac
Serbian First League: 2015–16

References

External links
 
 Mladen Sarajlin stats at utakmica.rs 
 

1995 births
Living people
People from Vršac
Association football forwards
Serbian footballers
FK Teleoptik players
OFK Beograd players
FK Kolubara players
FK Napredak Kruševac players
Serbian SuperLiga players
Serbian First League players